Gorman-Rupp is a pump manufacturer in Mansfield, Ohio. It manufactures pumps for municipal, water, wastewater, sewage, industrial, construction, petroleum, fire, and OEM markets. The company is traded on the New York Stock Exchange. Its current CEO is Scott King.

History 
Gorman Rupp was founded in 1933 by two entrepreneurs, J.C. Gorman and Herb Rupp. They introduced self-priming, centrifugal pumps to the market; skeptical competitors trying to discredit their design brought attention to the young company. The company has since grown to be one of the world's largest pump manufacturers: in 2021, it had sales of $378.3 Million.

Products 
When you buy Gorman-Rupp, you benefit from worldwide service centers, knowledgeable engineers, and a selection of nearly 3,000 pumps. Gorman-Rupp has been manufacturing pumps and pumping systems since 1933. Many of the innovations introduced by Gorman-Rupp have become industry standards.

Pump types offered by Gorman-Rupp include;

 Self-priming Centrifugal

 Standard Centrifugal
 Submersible
 Rotary Gear
 Priming Assisted
 Hydraulic Piston
 Vertical Turbine
 Engine-Driven Diaphragm
 Axial Flow
 Mixed Flow
 Rotary Vane
 Bellows Metering
 Oscillating
 Packaged Lift Stations
 Booster Stations

References

External links 
 

Manufacturing companies established in 1933
Companies listed on the New York Stock Exchange
Mansfield, Ohio
Manufacturing companies based in Ohio
Pump manufacturers
1933 establishments in Ohio